The 2021 Houston Dash season was the team's eighth season as an American professional women's soccer team in the National Women's Soccer League (NWSL).

The 2021 NWSL season returned as a full league season after COVID-19 caused the 2020 NWSL season to be limited to the 2020 NWSL Challenge Cup and Fall Series. The NWSL continued to showcase the Challenge Cup in 2021, prior to a full league season starting in late April.

Background

The Dash retained their 2020 NWSL Challenge Cup-winning coach and general manager, James Clarkson, and much of their roster from the previous season.

In June 2021, real-estate developer Ted Segal reportedly paid $400 million to purchase majority ownership of the Houston Dynamo and Dash, and the leasing rights to BBVA Stadium, from Gabriel Brener, who retained a minority stake.

Six of the Dash's regular starters participated in the 2020 Tokyo Olympics, held in July and August. Three Canadian national team members of the Dash returned from the competition as gold medalists: Allysha Chapman, Nichelle Prince, and Sophie Schmidt.

During the 2021 season, current and former players across the league leveled numerous allegations of abuse and misconduct among several teams' coaches and managers. The resulting investigations led to several coaches and managers being fired or asked to resign. Along with other coaching turnover during the 2021 season, Clarkson was the only male coach who started the season to retain his job at the end of it, though he would be suspended at the start of the 2022 Houston Dash season pending an investigation into allegations of misconduct.

Stadium
The Dash continued to play in BBVA Stadium in 2022. In June 2021, the stadium was rebranded as PNC Stadium following PNC Financial Services' acquisition of BBVA USA.

Player and staff

Roster

.

Staff

Competitions

NWSL Challenge Cup

The Dash returned to defend their title after winning the 2020 NWSL Challenge Cup. However, the Dash struggled to win matches and failed to advance from the group stage, claiming victory once and drawing three times to finish third behind OL Reign and eventual champions Portland Thorns FC in the West Division.

Divisional standings

National Women's Soccer League season

The Dash rose as high as third in the NWSL table during the season, and with three matches remaining required only one point to clinch a first-ever league playoffs berth. However, the Dash lost all three matches, going scoreless in each, and missed the playoffs for the eighth consecutive season.

Results

Standings

International Champions Cup

By virtue of being the 2020 NWSL Challenge Cup champions, the Women's International Champions Cup invited the Dash to the 2021 friendly exhibition tournament, staged on 18–21 August 2021 in Portland, Oregon. The Dash were joined by 2020 NWSL Fall Series winners Portland Thorns FC, 2019-20 UEFA Women's Champions League and 2019–20 Division 1 Féminine winners Olympique Lyon, and 2019–20 Primera División Femenina winners FC Barcelona Femení. The Dash drew against the Thorns in regulation of the semi-final match, but lost in a penalty shootout. The Dash also fell in the third-place match against FC Barcelona, despite rallying to a 2–1 lead in the second half.

Results

Bracket

References

External links

See also
 2021 National Women's Soccer League season
 2021 in American soccer

Houston Dash
Houston Dash
Houston Dash seasons